Berlyn can refer to:
 Ivan Berlyn (1867-1934), British stage and film actor
 Michael Berlyn (b. 1949), American video game designer and writer
 Nigel Berlyn (1934–2022), Australian naval officer
 Berlyn (Ukraine), a village in Ukraine
 a character of the wrestler Alex Wright